Isidro del Prado (born May 15, 1959) is a two-time Filipino Olympian. He holds the 400m Philippine records in athletics. He once held the 200m record which was broken in 2007 by Ralph Waldy Soguilon, a 100m and 200m Sprinter.

Del Prado is one of the two prominent athletes that was attributed to have been produced by the Gintong Alay sports program with the other athlete being Lydia de Vega. He won medals the 400m event at the 1982 and 1984 Asian Championships, as well as the 1981, 1983, 1987, and 1989 Southeast Asian Games. He along with Honesto Larce, Leopoldo Arnillo and Romeo Gido, also competed for the country in the 4x400 relay event at the Southeast Asian Games.

In 2009, he became a coach for the Bruneian national athletics team and helped Ak Hafiy Tajuddin Rositi break his own record at the men's 400 meters event at the 2012 Summer Olympics.

References

External links
 IAAF Profile

1959 births
Living people
People from Sorsogon
Filipino male sprinters
Athletes (track and field) at the 1984 Summer Olympics
Olympic track and field athletes of the Philippines
Asian Games medalists in athletics (track and field)
Athletes (track and field) at the 1982 Asian Games
Athletes (track and field) at the 1986 Asian Games
Athletes (track and field) at the 1990 Asian Games
Filipino track and field coaches
Filipino expatriate sportspeople in Brunei
Asian Games silver medalists for the Philippines
Asian Games bronze medalists for the Philippines
Medalists at the 1986 Asian Games
Southeast Asian Games medalists in athletics
Southeast Asian Games gold medalists for the Philippines
Southeast Asian Games silver medalists for the Philippines
Competitors at the 1985 Southeast Asian Games